Jessica Ann Fox (born 19 May 1983) is an English actress best known for playing Nancy Hayton on Channel 4 soap opera, Hollyoaks.

Early life
Fox received her acting training at the Redroofs Theatre School in Maidenhead, Berkshire, England.

Career
Fox was born in Maidenhead, Berkshire. Her early television and film roles included The Muppet Christmas Carol, in which she provided the voice of the Ghost of Christmas Past.  Shortly afterwards her career in television was furthered with roles in The Angel of Nitshill Road, May and June, Trial and Retribution, The Bill, The Detectives and the leading role of Anthea in the 1997 BBC children’s serial The Phoenix and the Carpet. She then moved to comedy, playing the "naughty but nice" Enid Nightshade in three series of The Worst Witch and the slightly naughtier Enid in the spinoff Weirdsister College. Co-starring with Sarah Lancashire, she then appeared in the role of Rusty Dickinson in Back Home.

Fox then moved into soaps, playing Belle Wise in Crossroads, and made a guest appearance in children's show Powers. In 2005, she was cast as newcomer Nancy Hayton in the Channel 4 soap opera Hollyoaks.

Personal life
On 15 October 2022 Fox announced she is pregnant with her first child.
Fox gives birth to her first child with husband Nicholas Willes, a boy named River on March 7, 2023.

Fox supports the charity Breast Cancer Care.

Filmography

Television

References

External links 
 
 
 

1983 births
English film actresses
English television actresses
English musical theatre actresses
English voice actresses
Living people
People educated at Redroofs Theatre School
English soap opera actresses